St. Albans is a station on the Long Island Rail Road's Montauk Branch in the St. Albans, Queens, New York on the southwest corner of Linden Boulevard and Montauk Place, although the segment of Montauk Place that once intersected with Linden Boulevard has been abandoned and fenced off.

History
In 1872, the LIRR's Cedarhurst Cut-off was built through the area, but no stop appears here on the first timetables. Saint Albans Station was built on July 1, 1898, and originally appeared on maps with the name of Locust Avenue (the same name as the station at the other end of what is now called Baisley Boulevard). The station was razed in 1935 as part of a grade elimination project. The current elevated structure was opened either on October 22 or October 23, 1935.

On May 21, 1973, the LIRR announced plans to significantly reduce service at Union Hall Street, Springfield Gardens, and St. Albans, with only a few trains stopping during rush hours. At St. Albans, service was limited to four westbound trains in the morning between 7 a.m. and 9 a.m., and four eastbound trains in the evening between 5 p.m. and 6:45 p.m..

Station layout
This station has one narrow six-car-long island platform between the two tracks with two entrances. The north staircase goes down to the south side of Linden Boulevard between Newburg and 180th Street while the south staircase goes down to a short tunnel leading to the dead-end street of Foch Boulevard.

Service
Although this station is listed on the West Hempstead Branch timetable only, most service is provided by Babylon Branch trains, hourly from about 6:00 AM to 11:00 PM during off peak periods. Babylon Branch trains also serve the station bihourly on weekends.

References

External links 

Staircase to Platforms; March 2007 (Unofficial LIRR History Website)
Former Coal Trestle (TrainsAreFun.com)
Saint Albans Station History (Arrt's Arrchives)
 Linden Boulevard entrance from Google Maps Street View
Platform from Google Maps Street View

Long Island Rail Road stations in New York City
Railway stations in Queens, New York
Railway stations in the United States opened in 1898